The 11th New Brunswick Legislative Assembly represented New Brunswick between January 20, 1835, and August 18, 1837.

The assembly sat at the pleasure of the Governor of New Brunswick Sir Archibald Campbell.

The speaker of the house was selected as Charles Simonds.

History

Members

Notes:

References
Journal of the House of Assembly of the province of New Brunswick from ... January to ... March[1835] (1835)

Terms of the New Brunswick Legislature
1835 in Canada
1836 in Canada
1837 in Canada
1835 establishments in New Brunswick
1837 disestablishments in New Brunswick